The Rao Bahaddur Ramanath Iyer Award was instituted to promote the cotton research work, in India. This is being bestowed by the Indian Society for Cotton Improvement.  Mumbai. Ramanath Iyer was a prominent cotton breeder in Tamil nadu, during the early part of 20th Century.

See also

 List of agriculture awards

Agriculture awards of India
Year of establishment missing